The Ethiopian Catholic Church is a metropolitan sui iuris Eastern particular church within the Catholic Church, established in 1930 in Ethiopia.

Like the other Eastern Catholic Churches, the Ethiopian Catholic Church is in full communion with the Holy See. It holds the Christological doctrine of the Council of Chalcedon and accepts the universal jurisdiction of the pope. These points distinguish it from the Ethiopian Orthodox Tewahedo Church, an Oriental Orthodox Church which comprises most Christians in the country.

The Ethiopian Catholic Church follows the Alexandrian liturgical rite used by the Ethiopian Orthodox Tewahedo Church and the Coptic Church. As its liturgical language it employs Ge'ez, a Semitic language that fell out of daily use several centuries ago.

Terminology 
Since January 2015, the term "Ethiopic Catholic Church" can be applied to either the church proper, the Eritrean Catholic Church or to both jointly, since the liturgy of both churches is celebrated in the Ethiopic or Ge'ez language.

History
The Portuguese voyages of discovery opened the way for direct contacts between the Catholic Church and the Ethiopian Orthodox Church. In the 14th century, Catholic missionaries arrived in Ethiopia. On 28 August 1439, Pope Eugene IV sent a message of unity with the Catholic Church to Ethiopian Emperor Constantine I, but this effort was unsuccessful.

With Islamic attacks up to 1531 threatening Christian Ethiopia, an appeal from the Emperor to the Portuguese brought support to defeat the Adal Sultanate in the Ethiopian–Adal War. Jesuit missionaries came with the Portuguese to Ethiopia. These missionaries focused their conversion activities on the country's governing class, including the Emperor, to have the Ethiopian Orthodox Church unite with the Catholic Church. The Emperor Susenyos was converted primarily by Father Pedro Páez. In 1622, Susenyos made Catholicism the state religion. The next year, Pope Gregory XV named Afonso Mendes, a Portuguese Jesuit, Patriarch of the Ethiopian Church. A formal union in 1626 was declared when Patriarch Mendes came to the country. With Mendes trying to Latinize the Ethiopian church, Susenyos used force to impose the Latinization. Public backlash resulted. In 1632, Susenyos died. His successor Fasilides in 1636 removed Mendes from the country, ended the union with Rome and removed or killed the remaining missionaries. For the next 200 years, Ethiopia was closed to Catholic Missions.

In 1839, Italian Lazarist and Capuchins missionaries arrived, albeit within certain limitations imposed on them due to strong public opposition. That same year, Justin de Jacobis was appointed first Prefect Apostolic of Abyssinia and entrusted with the foundation of Catholic missions in that country. After laboring with great success in Abyssinia for eight years, he was appointed titular Bishop of Nilopolis in 1847, and shortly afterwards Vicar Apostolic of Abyssinia, but he refused the episcopal dignity until it was finally forced upon him in 1849.

In 1919, the Pontifical Ethiopian College was founded within the Vatican walls by Pope Benedict XV with St. Stephen's Church, behind St. Peter's Basilica, as the designated church for the College.

The Latin Church had become established in the south of Ethiopia in areas that had not been Christian and that were incorporated into the modern country only at the end of the 19th century. The Italian occupation of Ethiopia in 1936 gave rise to an increase in the number of Latin-Church jurisdictions, but the expulsion of foreign missionaries at the end of the Second World War meant that the Ethiopic Rite clergy had to take responsibility for areas thus denuded of Catholic clergy. Accordingly, in 1951, the Ethiopic Rite Apostolic Exarchate of Addis Ababa was established, and the ordinariate for Eritrea was elevated to the rank of exarchate. Ten years later, on 20 February 1961, an Ethiopic ecclesiastical province was established, with Addis Ababa as the Metropolitan See and Asmara (in Eritrea) and Adigrat (in Ethiopia) as suffragan eparchies.

In 1995, two new eparchies, Barentu and Keren, were established in Eritrea, and the Latin-Church apostolic vicariate was abolished. Eritrea thus became the only country where all Catholics, whatever Church of their canonical ascription, belong to an Eastern Catholic jurisdiction. In 2003, one more eparchy was created in Endibir in the Southern Nations, Nationalities and Peoples' Region of Ethiopia.

In January 2015 Pope Francis established the Eritrean Catholic Church as a sui iuris Eastern Catholic Church, thus granting it autonomy from the Ethiopian Catholic Church.

There are also Latin Church jurisdictions in the south of Ethiopia, none of them raised to the rank of diocese. Eight are apostolic vicariates and one is an apostolic prefecture.

Eparchies
There are four eparchies (bishoprics) in the country:

Archeparchy of Addis Abeba (metropolitan see)
Eparchy of Adigrat
Eparchy of Bahir Dar–Dessie
Eparchy of Emdeber

Differences between the Catholic and Orthodox Ethiopian churches

Doctrinal distinctions between the Ethiopian Orthodox Tewahedo Church and the Catholic Ethiopian Churches include recognition of the fifth-century Council of Chalcedon. The order of the diaconate is reserved for adult men in the Catholic Church, but boys are commonly ordained as deacons in the Ethiopian Orthodox Church. Ethiopian Catholic clergy also tend to dress in the Roman cassock and collar, distinct from the Ethiopian Orthodox custom.

See also
 Christianity in Ethiopia
 Catholic Church in Ethiopia
 Religion in Ethiopia
 List of Catholic dioceses in Ethiopia

References

External links
 Article on The Ethiopian Catholic Church by Ronald Roberson on the CNEWA website
Video of an Ethiopian (Ge'ez rite) Catholic Mass

 
Eastern Catholicism in Ethiopia
Catholic Church in Ethiopia
Christian organizations established in 1930
Christian denominations established in the 20th century
1930 establishments in Ethiopia